Left of the Middle is the debut studio album by Australian singer Natalie Imbruglia, released on 24 November 1997 by RCA Records. It is primarily an alternative pop album. Spurred by the success of lead single "Torn", the album reached number one in Imbruglia's home country and top 10 in both the UK and US. The album went on to secure Imbruglia an ARIA for Best Pop Release and three Grammy nominations, Best Pop Vocal Album, Best Female Pop Vocal Performance for the single "Torn", and Best New Artist.

The album sold over 7 million copies worldwide by 2002, making it the best-selling debut album by a female Australian singer. The single "Identify", which Imbruglia recorded for the soundtrack of the 1999 film Stigmata, only appears on the Taiwanese edition of the album, as well as on the compilation album, Glorious: The Singles 97–07.

Track listing

Charts

Weekly charts

Year-end charts

Certifications

References

1997 debut albums
ARIA Award-winning albums
Natalie Imbruglia albums
Albums produced by Nigel Godrich
RCA Records albums
Alternative rock albums by Australian artists